Deer Creek Public Schools serves students in northwestern Oklahoma County and southwestern Logan County in Oklahoma. As of October 2018, the district enrolls 6,646 students.

There are nine schools in the district: Deer Creek High School, Deer Creek Intermediate School, Deer Creek Middle School, Deer Creek Elementary School, Deer Creek Prairie Vale Elementary School, Deer Creek Rose Union Elementary School, Deer Creek Grove Valley Elementary School, Deer Creek 4th And 5th Grade Center, and Deer Creek Spring Creek Elementary School.

History
Deer Creek opened in 1921. Deer Creek is a growing community sprawling over the border between Oklahoma County and Logan County. It is named for the nearby Deer Creek, which snakes through much of the district and occasionally causes the schools to close by flooding during times of heavy rains.

This region of Oklahoma was part of the Unassigned Lands and was settled during the Oklahoma Land Run of 1889. Sections were organized into larger entities, called townships, that consisted of 36 numbered sections. Following a pattern set during the settling of the Northwest Territories in 1787, the Organic Act dedicated section No. 16 for the support of public schools. In the Deer Creek Public School District, both northern quarters and the southwestern quarter were sold to raise funds to build the school. The first school was built on the southeast quarter-section, at what is now called N. MacArthur Boulevard and W. 206th Street in the unincorporated part of Oklahoma County.

During the Great Depression, the federal Works Project Administration built a one-story, red-brick school at the far southeastern corner of this quarter-section. This building included a half-court basketball gymnasium, about a dozen classrooms, and a small library. A gymnasium and separate cafeteria were added later. The buildings have since been demolished, but the trees that surrounded the building are still present, and part of the building's brick façade is used on the entrance to the high school's auditorium.

Schools
Since the early 1980s, the district has expanded considerably due to exurban sprawl. It now has five elementary schools, none of which are at the original location. Prairie Vale Elementary School was the first school built away from the original site. It is near the western border of the City of Edmond and on the border of northwest Oklahoma City. Deer Creek Elementary moved several miles south and serves primarily students living in the Memorial and MacArthur area of Oklahoma City. Grove Valley covers the NW 192nd and Portland (Highway 74) area. In the 2008–2009 school year, the four elementary schools enrolled a total of 1,850 students in grades pre-K through 5. A fifth elementary, Spring Creek Elementary, opened in August 2013 and is located off of Rockwell and 150th.

Deer Creek High School (DCHS) is located in northern Oklahoma County, Oklahoma, north of Oklahoma City and west of Edmond on the northwest corner of NW 206th Street and MacArthur Boulevard. The high school has dramatically expanded over the past half-decade. The high school facilities include a two-story annex, a freshman academy, Alumni Hall, the old gym, a PAAC (Performing Arts & Athletic Center), a multi-sport complex, and a new football stadium.

A new middle school is located on NW 234th Street just east of N. May. It is for seventh and eighth grades. The old middle school is now the intermediate school for the sixth grade. Deer Creek High School enrolls 1,356 students in grades 9–12.

Awards
Deer Creek Middle School, Deer Creek Elementary, Deer Creek Grove Valley, Deer Creek Prairie Vale, and Deer Creek High School are Blue Ribbon Schools.

Sports
All schools in this district have the same mascot, the "Deer Creek Antlers".

Construction
Two more elementary schools and another middle school are planned. Grove Valley Elementary recently opened in August 2009. All three existing elementary schools have had classrooms added.

The new expansion of the high school is currently done and many teachers have moved classrooms. The current high school building began in the early 1980s as the two short arms (originally intended to form an X shape) that point northeast and southeast on the east face of the classroom building. Since then, it has been expanded several times, more than tripling its original size to accommodate the rapidly growing student body.

A recently passed $142 million bond issue will fund the construction of a new middle school on NW 234th St. near May Ave., a fifth elementary school near NW 150th and Rockwell, several more additions to the high school campus, multimillion-dollar athletic and activity buildings including a large gymnasium and an attached performing arts center.

The new middle school is currently open and running, with seventh and eighth graders inside. The old middle school is now called the Intermediate school, accommodating the fifth and sixth grade students of the district

References

External links
School District
Deer Creek Elementary School
Prairie Vail Elementary School
Rose Union Elementary School
Grove Valley Elementary School
Spring Creek Elementary School
Intermediate School
Middle School
High School
4th And 5th Grade Center
Deer Creek Parent Voice Oklahoma
Deer Creek Parents and Community
Deer Creek Plac

School districts in Oklahoma
Education in Oklahoma County, Oklahoma
Education in Logan County, Oklahoma
Edmond, Oklahoma
School districts established in 1921